Haley McGee is a Canadian actress, writer and comedian based in London. McGee is best known for her role as Dorothy Skerritt, the personal assistant to Nikola Tesla in the Doctor Who episode Nikola Tesla's Night of Terror. She is also known for her solo performances, most recently Age Is A Feeling and The Ex-Boyfriend Yard Sale.

Age Is A Feeling 
McGee's 2022 show premiered at the Edinburgh Festival and was a winner of the Fringe First Award.

It tells the story of a single human life from the 25th birthday until death. The story is told entirely in the second person and includes sections of branching narrative based on audience selections. The show began its run at Edinburgh on 27th July, and will continue at the Soho Theatre in London in September. 

The Scotsman described the show as "a superb performance and a sensitive, smartly structured piece of writing, full of wit and an astonishing amount of wisdom from someone who's only 36 years old"

The Ex-Boyfriend Yard Sale 

McGee's 2018 solo show invites the audience to value eight objects, each a gift from a former boyfriend. McGee states that the inspiration for the show was finding herself in debt after moving to London, and needing to work out which objects should be sold in order to pay off her debts. 

McGee developed the show in partnership with Melanie Frances, a mathematician and digital artist who helped develop a formula which included inputs such as the “relationship index”, measures her time with each ex on a scale of one to 10, “how hard they made you laugh, the ratio of fun-to-misery and how good the sex was”. McGee reveals how the formula is derived as the show unfolds. 

The show was adapted into a book which was published in May 2021 by Penguin Random House Canada and Hodder & Stougton in the UK. McGee. McGee also developed this concept into an audio series, The Cost of Love, an interview format podcast released concurrently with the book.

14 Day Creative Challenge 
During the COVID-19 Lockdown of summer 2020, McGee developed and led a 14 Day Creative Challenge, a self-directed programme intended to allow artists to remain creative at a time when venues for creative work remained closed. The programme reached an online audience of over 1000.

Works 

 Oh My Irma (2011)
 Weather the Weather (2013)
 I'm Doing This for You (2015)
 The Public Servant (2015)
 The Ex-Boyfriend Yard Sale (2018)
 Age Is a Feeling (2022)

References

External links

Year of birth missing (living people)
Living people
Canadian television actresses
Actresses from Ontario
Toronto Metropolitan University alumni